Physica Particularis may refer to several Latin-language physics books:

 Institutiones physicae pars altera, seu physica particularis (Trnava/Nagyszombat 1756/1761), by Andreas Jaszlinszky
 Philosophia naturalis seu physica generalis et particularis (Vienna 1755), by Joseph Redlhamer
 Physica Particularis (Graz 1766), by Leopold Biwald
 Physica particularis (Guadalajara 18th century), essay by Francisco Javier Clavijero
 Physica Particularis (Trnava/Venice 1770/1782), by Johann Baptiste Horvath — * Physica Particularis (Vol.I+II, Paris, 1750–1754), by Pierre Lemonnier
 Secunda Secundae, sive Physica in Particulari (Lyon 1648), by Philip of the Blessed Trinity